Boys' Record is a special single album by the South Korean boy band VIXX. The album was released on February 24, 2015 under the label of Jellyfish Entertainment. The song "Love Equation" was used to promote the album.

Background and release
On January 16, it was reported that VIXX was planning a February comeback with a new remake album. On February 11, R.ef's "Farewell Formula" was revealed as the title track for the new remake album via VIXX's social media accounts. On February 20, the music video teaser for "Love Equation" was released. On February 24, Boys' Record was released along with the music video for "Love Equation".

On March 18, 2015, VIXX marked their first official entry into the Chinese and Taiwanese markets with the release of "命中注定 (Destiny Love)", a remake of Harlem Yu's "Destiny Love". It was released through Avex Taiwan as a special Chinese edition of Boys' Record. A music video was also released through Avex Taiwan's YouTube Channel.

Composition
The EP consists of three tracks and one instrumental. The first track on the album, "Love Equation", was written by Yoon Sung-hee with the rap being written by Ravi. The song was composed by in house producers Hong Jae-Seon, MELODESIGN and Cho Yong-ho. The story being told by VIXX is how they overcome their breakups and move forward to the future. The second track "On a Cold Night" was composed by Leo and MELODESIGN with lyrics written by Leo and Ravi. The third track "Memory" was composed by MELODESIGN, Lee Seul-ki and Ravi who also wrote the lyrics.

Promotion
VIXX began promoting this single on February 24, 2015. They performed on various music programs including KBS's Music Bank, MBC's Show! Music Core, SBS's Inkigayo, Mnet's,  M! Countdown and MBC Music's Show Champion. VIXX gained their first win for "Love Equation" on March 3 on The Show. The song was an all-kill on all the music shows. The group achieved their first triple crown on The Show.

Track listing
The credits are adapted from the official homepage of the group.

Chart performance

Awards and nominations

Awards

Music program awards

Personnel
VIXX – vocals
Cha Hakyeon (N) – lead vocals, background vocals
Jung Taekwoon (Leo) – main vocals, background vocals, songwriting
Lee Jaehwan (Ken)- main vocals, background vocals
Kim Wonsik (Ravi) – rap, songwriting
Lee Hongbin – vocals
Han Sanghyuk (Hyuk) – vocals
Yoon Sung-hee – songwriting
Lee Seul-ki – producer, music
Cho Yong-ho – producer, music
Hong Jae-Seon – producer, music
MELODESIGN – producer, music

Release history

See also
 List of Gaon Album Chart number ones of 2015

References

External links
 
 
 Boys' Record - EP on iTunes

2015 albums
VIXX albums
Korean-language albums
Jellyfish Entertainment albums
Stone Music Entertainment albums
Single albums